Vladimir Yuryevich Kaloyev (born 12 February 1973) is a former Russian football player.

References

1973 births
Living people
Soviet footballers
FC Spartak Vladikavkaz players
Russian footballers
FC Dynamo Stavropol players
Russian Premier League players
Association football midfielders
PFC Spartak Nalchik players
FC Mashuk-KMV Pyatigorsk players